The Mainzer Adelsverein at Biebrich am Rhein (Verein zum Schutze Deutscher Einwanderer in Texas, "Society for the Protection of German Immigrants in Texas"), better known as the Mainzer Adelsverein ("Nobility Society of Mainz"), organized on April 20, 1842, was a colonial attempt to establish a new German settlement within the borders of Texas.

History

The Adelsverein was organized on April 20, 1842, by 21 German noblemen at Biebrich on the Rhine.  They gathered at the castle of the German Duke of Nassau, the future Adolphe, Grand Duke of Luxembourg, who was named Protector of the Society. In Germany, the society was referred to as Mainzer Adelsverein after the city of Mainz, where it was officially registered. The society represented a significant effort to establish a new Germany on Texas soil through organized mass emigration. The land for the emigrants was to be purchased by the Adelsverein or secured through land grants from the Republic of Texas.

On January 9, 1843, Count Ludwig Joseph von Boos-Waldeck bought the 4,428-acre Nassau Plantation in Fayette County, Texas, for $0.75 an acre and  named it for the Duke of Nassau.  Twenty-five slaves were bought to work the property, which initially was considered as the primary base for arriving German immigrants. When Prince Carl of Solms-Braunfels inspected the plantation in 1844, he recommended the Verein divest itself of the property, rather than be associated with slavery. Gustav Dresel, Special Business Agent for the Adelsverein, sold Nassau Plantation on July 28, 1848, to Otto von Roeder. Von Roeder had been the first settler in Shelby, Texas, in 1841, a year before the Adelsverein was founded in Germany, and three years before the Adelsverein sent its first colonists to Texas. Von Roeder had emigrated to Texas from Westphalia in the 1830s and was not affiliated with the Adelsverein's colonization efforts. The community of Shelby had been named for David Shelby, one of the Old Three Hundred under Stephen F. Austin. Shelby became the home of many Adelsverein colonists in 1845, but it was not founded by the organization. Shelby was one of the Latin Settlement communities populated by German intellectuals who had settled in Texas after 1848.

Prince Carl was appointed commissioner general by the Adelsverein in May 1844 to lead its colony in Texas. Each head of household was required to deposit 600 gulden (300 gulden for a single person) with the Adelsverein to cover transportation and housing at the colony and as credit to draw upon until they made their first harvest. The first Adelsverein-sponsored immigrants arrived in Galveston in July 1844. They traveled from Galveston to Indianola in December 1844, then moved inland to land grants acquired by the Adelsverein near Comal Springs. Prince Solms named the first colony New Braunfels in honor of his homeland.

Henry Francis Fisher and Burchard Miller sold their 1842 land grant to the Adelsverein on June 22, 1844. This grant was intended to provide for more settlements in Texas.  After Prince Solms returned to Germany, John O. Meusebach was appointed the second commissioner general of the Adelsverein in April 1845. He founded the first settlement on the outskirts of the land grant, and named it Fredericksburg, in honor of Adelsverein member Prince Frederick of Prussia. The land grant was located in Comanche territory, and to colonize, Meusebach first negotiated a treaty between the German Immigration Company (Adelsverein) and the Penateka Comanche. A separate agreement was made with  the Darmstadt Forty, to settle socialist colonies within the land grant.

In 1853, due to a large amount of debt, Adelsverein ended its colonization campaign in Texas.

Darmstadt Society of Forty

Count Castell negotiated with the separate Darmstadt Society of Forty to colonize 200 families on the Fisher–Miller Land Grant territory in Texas.  In return, they were to receive $12,000 in money, livestock, equipment, and provisions for a year.  After the first year, the colonies were expected to support themselves. The colonies attempted were Castell, Leiningen, Bettina, Schoenburg and Meerholz in Llano County; Darmstädler Farm in Comal County; and Tusculum in Kendall County. Of these, only Castell survives. The colonies failed after the Adelsverein funding expired, and also due to conflict of structure and authorities. Some members moved to other Adelsverein settlements in Texas.  Others moved elsewhere, or returned to Germany.

Texas settlements

Fisher–Miller Land Grant colonies
Bettina, Llano County
Castell, Llano County
Leningen, Llano County
Meerholz, Llano County
Schoenburg, Llano County

Elsewhere
Indianola, Calhoun County
Fredericksburg, Gillespie County
Nassau Plantation, Fayette County
New Braunfels, Comal County
Sisterdale, Kendall County
Tusculum, Kendall County
Gruene, Comal County
New Ulm, Austin County
Schertz, Texas

Members

Founding members

Source:

Adolf, Duke of Nassau 
Bernhard II, Duke of Saxe-Meiningen
Ernest II, Duke of Saxe-Coburg and Gotha
Prince Frederick of Prussia
Friedrich Günther, Prince of Schwarzburg-Rudolstadt
Carl, 3rd Prince of Leiningen
Prince Hermann von Wied
Prince Ferdinand von Solms-Braunfels
Prince Franz von Colloredo-Mansfeld
Prince Otto Victor von Schoenberg-Waldenburg
Prince Carl of Solms-Braunfels (Prince of Solms-Braunfels Rheingrafenstein)
Prince Alexander von Solms-Braunfels
Count Christian von Alt-Leiningen-Westerburg
Count Viktor August of Leiningen-Westerburg-Alt-Leiningen
Count Carl Frederick Christian of Castell-Castell
Count Carl von Isenburg-Meerholz
Count Edmund von Hatzfeld
Count Carl William von Inn und Knyphausen-Lutelsberg
Count Armand von Rennesse
Count Carl von Castell
Baron Paul Scirnay

Leadership

Archduke of Nassau – Protector
Carl, 3rd Prince of Leiningen  – President
Count Carl Frederick Christian of Castell-Castell – Vice President, Executive Secretary-Business Director
Count Viktor August of Leiningen-Westerburg-Alt-Leiningen – Co-founder
Count Ludwig Joseph von Boos-Waldeck – Co-Founder
Baron August von Bibra – General Manager
Gustav Dresel – Special Business Agent
Philip Cappes – Special Commissioner
Prince Carl of Solms-Braunfels – First Commissioner-General
John O. Meusebach – Second Commissioner-General
Hermann Spiess – Third Commissioner-General

See also
 American Redoubt
 Free State Project
 German colonial projects before 1871

References

Sources

External links

A Guide to the Solms-Braunfels Archives, 1842–1957 at UT-Austin
August von Bibra in Handbook of Texas Online
Article: From "The Germans: Geh Mit Ins Texas"
Adelsverein in Handbook of Texas Online
Immigration Contract 1845
Collection of Adelsverein Documents, 1845-1864 This collection includes 44 documents relating to the German colonization of Texas and the Adelsverein, also known as Society for the Protection of German Emigrants to Texas (Verein zum Schutze Deutscher Einwanderer in Texas). The Adelsverein brought thousands of German emigrants to Texas beginning in 1844. These documents include land grants, emigration contracts, promotional materials, and fiscal documents.

Pre-statehood history of Texas
German-American culture in Texas
Former territorial entities in North America
Former regions and territories of the United States
States and territories established in 1842
1842 establishments in North America
Texas Hill Country